Mbuyapey is a district of the Paraguarí Department in Paraguay. It is located 182 km southeast of Asunción and has a population of around 14,512.

Sources 																
World Gazeteer: Paraguay – World-Gazetteer.com										

Populated places in the Paraguarí Department